Miss Grand Spain 2017 is the 2nd edition of Miss Grand Spain beauty contest, held at Teatro de la Villa del Conocimiento y las Artes, Mairena del Alcor on 8 July 2017. The Miss Grand Spain 2017 is Mariana Rico from Balearic Islands crowned her successor, Mariana Rico then represented Spain at the Miss Grand International 2017 pageant held on October 25 in Vietnam.

References

External links

 Miss Grand Spain official website

Grand Spain
Miss Grand Spain
Beauty pageants in Spain